SMPTE ST 296 is a standard published by SMPTE which defines the 720 line high definition video formats including 720p50 and 720p60. It is frequently carried on serial digital interface  physical cables defined by the SMPTE 292M standard.

The standard is also known as SMPTE 296M, but was renamed following a policy change by SMPTE dropping the "M" (which originally referred to "Metric").

See also
 SMPTE 274M

References

 
"ST 296:2011 - SMPTE Standard - 1280 × 720 Progressive Image Sample Structure — Analog and Digital Representation and Analog Interface," in ST 296:2011 , vol., no., pp.1-21, 25 Oct. 2011, doi: 10.5594/SMPTE.ST296.2011.

Film and video technology
SMPTE standards